Gorky may refer to:

People
Maxim Gorky (1868–1936), Russian author and political activist, founder of socialist realism
Arshile Gorky (1904–1948), Armenian-American abstract expressionist painter

Inhabited localities
Gorky, name of Nizhny Novgorod, Soviet Union from 1932 to 1990

Other uses
Gorky Reservoir, on the Volga in Nizhny Novgorod Oblast, Russia
2768 Gorky, asteroid
Gorky, original band of Luc De Vos and predecessor of his subsequent band Gorki
Gorky, their first album

See also
Gorki (disambiguation)
Górki (disambiguation), various locations in Poland
Gorky Park (disambiguation)
Gorky Film Studio, Moscow
Gorky's Zygotic Mynci, Welsh indie band, 1991–2006
Gorky 5, their fifth album
Gorky 17 (aka Odium), turn-based tactics computer game